The Life Jacket is Under Your Seat is a 1998 Uruguayan comedy film directed by Leonardo Ricagni, with a screenplay by Pato Lopez, based on the novel El regreso del gran Tuleque by Mauricio Rosencof

Plot
Its script is based on the novel El regreso del gran Tuleque by Mauricio Rosencof.

The film is named based on the mispronounced name of an authentic Chevrolet car, transformed into a peddler car, which appears in the main scenes.

A very important musical feature is the tamboriles. Other meaningful music tunes heard in the soundtrack are from El Peyote Asesino, La Abuela Coca, Plátano Macho, and Hot Jam Band.

The postproduction of the sound was performed at Twickenham Film Studios. 

The film was nominated for best screenplay at the Argentina Film Critics Association Awards.

Cast
Jorge Esmoris
 Rubén Rada
 Leo Maslíah
 Hugo Fattoruso
 Pastora Vega
 Pipo Cipolatti
 Tabaré Rivero
 Augusto Mazzarelli
 Petru Valensky

References

External links
 

1999 films
Uruguayan comedy films
1990s Spanish-language films
Films set in Montevideo
Films shot in Montevideo
Films scored by Mario Grigorov